Anthony Noble Frankland CB, CBE, DFC (4 July 1922 – 31 October 2019) was a British historian who served as Director General of the Imperial War Museum.

Education
Frankland attended Trinity College, Oxford from March 1941 to May 1942, and then from October 1945 to November 1947.

World War II service
He served in the Royal Air Force (RAF) from 1941 to 1945, as a navigator in RAF Bomber Command and was awarded the Distinguished Flying Cross in 1944. He left the RAF in 1945 with the rank of Flight Lieutenant. Subsequently, awarded Chevalier of the Légion d'honneur for his involvement in the liberation of France in 1944.

Post-war career
From 1948 until 1951 he worked at the Air Historical Branch of the Air Ministry, and received his DPhil from Oxford in April 1951. He was an Official Military Historian to the Cabinet Office between 1951 and 1958. During this time he and his co-author Sir Charles Webster wrote a four volume official history of the RAF's strategic air offensive against Germany. This was part of the official History of the Second World War series. In 1963, he was invited to give the Lees Knowles Lecture and lectured on The Strategic Air Offensive.

From 1958 to 1960, he was deputy director of studies at the Royal Institute of International Affairs, leaving to become Director of the Imperial War Museum (IWM), a post he held from 1960 to 1982. As Director of the IWM, he transformed it from a failing institution into one of the world's leading historical centres for the study of the conflicts of the 20th century. During 1971–74, he was historical advisor to the Thames Television series The World at War (as well as being interviewed for the series) and completed several books on historical subjects.

Bibliography
Documents on International Affairs, 1956. (assisted by Vera King 1960?)
The Strategic Air Offensive Against Germany. 4 volumes. London: Her Majesty's Stationery Office, 1961. official British history and co-authored with Sir Charles Webster.
The Bombing Offensive Against Germany: Outlines and Perspectives (1965)
Aspects of War (Imperial War Museum. (1969) ASIN B001BMRATA
Bomber Offensive: the Devastation of Europe (1970)
The Politics and Strategy of the Second World War (joint editor, 8 vols. 1974–78)
Encyclopedia of 20th Century Warfare (general editor, 1989)
Nicholas II: Crown of Tragedy (1960)
Bomber Offensive: The Devastation of Europe (Ballantine's Illustrated History of World War II. Campaign Book no. 7, 1970)
Decisive Battles of the Twentieth Century (editor with Christopher Dowling 1976)
Prince Henry, Duke of Gloucester (1980)
Witness of a Century: the Life and Times of Prince Arthur, Duke of Connaught (18501942) (1993).
History at War: The Campaigns of a Historian (pbk 1998)
The Unseen War (novel) Book Guild Ltd (2007)
Fighting Naked on the Beaches (novel) Book Guild (2007)

Other works
  Noble Frankland (1981). Preface to The Imperial War Museum Duxford Handbook
  Noble Frankland (1981). Introduction to  A Concise Catalogue of Paintings drawings and Sculpture of the first World War 1914–1918, Second Edition

References

1922 births
2019 deaths
Frankland, Noble
Companions of the Order of the Bath
Directors of the Imperial War Museum
Noble
List_of_foreign_recipients_of_the_Légion_d'Honneur#United_Kingdom
Recipients of the Distinguished Flying Cross (United Kingdom)
Royal Air Force Volunteer Reserve personnel of World War II
Frankland, Noble
The World at War
Alumni of Trinity College, Oxford